XGIII: Extreme G Racing, also known as Extreme-G 3, is a racing video game developed by Acclaim Studios Cheltenham and published by Acclaim Entertainment for PlayStation 2 and GameCube. The game is followed by XGRA: Extreme G Racing Association.

Gameplay

It the game depicts the sport of "Extreme-G" racing in the 23rd century. The player takes the role of one of the twelve riders competing in a championship, each representing one of the six teams of two. The game career mode starts in the slowest class, 250G, and as the player progresses through the career, they will eventually make it into the 1000G class, the fastest in the game.

The sound barrier conventions from Extreme-G 2 are transferred here.

10 tracks are included, with twists, drops, and sharp turns. Extreme-G 3 handles weaponry differently, resulting in a significant change in gameplay from the first and second games. While in the first and second games, the player could pick up weapons on the track, and firing these weapons would not consume their primary weapon bar, in the third game, the player purchases weapons with money won, and firing weapons consumes a small amount of the weapon bar for each shot. Compared to the previous games, Extreme-G 3 offers fewer weapons.

Reception

Extreme-G 3 received "favorable" reviews on both platforms according to the review aggregation website Metacritic. Gary Whitta of NextGen called the PlayStation 2 version a solid title for fans of Wipeout-style racers. It was nominated for GameSpots annual "Best Driving Game" prize among console games, which went to Gran Turismo 3: A-Spec.

References

External links
 

2001 video games
Acclaim Entertainment games
Science fiction racing games
GameCube games
PlayStation 2 games
Video games developed in the United Kingdom
Video games set in the 23rd century